The 2001 Rebellion was third annual Rebellion professional wrestling pay-per-view event produced by the American promotion, World Wrestling Federation (WWF, now WWE). It took place on November 3, 2001, at the Manchester Arena in Manchester, England and was broadcast exclusively in the United Kingdom. It was the final Rebellion event promoted under the WWF name, as the promotion was renamed to World Wrestling Entertainment (WWE) in May 2002. It was also the final Rebellion produced before the promotion introduced the brand extension in March 2002.

The event took place during The Invasion period for the WWF, which ended at the next pay-per-view, Survivor Series. All matches had one member of the WWF taking on one member of the Alliance (composed of wrestlers originally from World Championship Wrestling and Extreme Championship Wrestling). Over the course of the evening, the WWF won six matches, while the Alliance won three.

Production

Background
Rebellion was an annual United Kingdom-exclusive pay-per-view produced by the American professional wrestling promotion, World Wrestling Federation (WWF, now WWE), since 1999. The 2001 event was the third event in the Rebellion chronology. It was scheduled to be held on November 3, 2001, at the Manchester Arena in Manchester, England.

Storylines
The event featured nine professional wrestling matches and two pre-show matches that involved different wrestlers from pre-existing scripted feuds and storylines. Wrestlers portrayed villains, heroes, or less distinguishable characters in the scripted events that built tension and culminated in a wrestling match or series of matches.

Event

Prior to the start of the pay-per-view, Billy and Chuck representing WWF defeated Justin Credible and Lance Storm representing The Alliance.

The first match of the pay-per-view was a steel cage match for the WWF Intercontinental Championship. Edge representing the WWF defeated Christian representing the Alliance, by escaping the cage while Christian's leg was stuck in between the rope and cage.

The second match saw Scotty 2 Hotty, representing the WWF, by hitting a bulldog followed by The Worm on The Hurricane, representing the Alliance, for the win. Following this Big Show, representing the WWF, defeated Diamond Dallas Page, representing the Alliance, by hitting a chokeslam on DDP.

The next match was an Elimination Triple Threat match for the WCW Tag Team Championship. The Dudley Boyz (Bubba Ray Dudley and D-Von Dudley), representing the Alliance, beat both WWF teams, The APA (Bradshaw and Faarooq) and The Hardy Boyz (Jeff Hardy and Matt Hardy). Matt first eliminated Faarooq after the Dudleyz hit a reverse neckbreaker on him, followed by a Twist of Fate. D-Von then pinned Matt after Jeff missed a Swanton and the Dudleyz hit Matt with a 3-D.

The following match saw William Regal, representing the Alliance, defeating Tajiri, representing the WWF, via submission with the Regal Stretch.

The WCW Championship match was next. This match saw Chris Jericho, representing the WWF, defending his title  against Kurt Angle, representing the Alliance. Jericho successfully retained his title after he rolled up Angle as he was going for the Olympic Slam. After the match, Angle attacked Jericho, hitting him with two Olympic Slams.

The second to last match was a women's tag team match with Trish Stratus as special guest referee. The match saw Lita  and Torrie Wilson, representing the WWF, taking on Mighty Molly and Stacy Keibler, representing the Alliance. After Wilson threw Holly into the corner, Lita hit Holly with a Twist of Fate to pick up the pinfall victory. After the match, Keibler argued with Stratus over the ending, to which Stratus responded by hitting Keibler with a bulldog.

The main event was for the WWF Championship. This match saw Stone Cold Steve Austin, representing the Alliance, defending his title against The Rock, representing the WWF. While the referee was down, Kurt Angle came out to the ring and hit The Rock with a chair. Jericho came out and attacked Angle, grabbing the chair. When The Rock stood up, he saw Jericho with the chair, assuming he was the one who attacked him, and The Rock attacked Jericho. The match ended when The Rock went for the People's Elbow; However, Angle hit The Rock in the face with the belt as he hit the ropes, enabling Austin to hit The Stone Cold Stunner and retain the title.

Aftermath
The 2001 Rebellion was the final Rebellion event produced under the WWF name, as the company was renamed to World Wrestling Entertainment (WWE) in May 2002. It was also the final Rebellion produced before the promotion introduced the brand extension in March 2002, which divided the roster into two separate brands, Raw and SmackDown!, where wrestlers were exclusively assigned to perform. The following year's event was subsequently a SmackDown!-exclusive show.

Results

See also

Professional wrestling in the United Kingdom

References

Professional wrestling in England
Events in Manchester
2001 in England
November 2001 events in the United Kingdom
2001 WWF pay-per-view events
WWE Rebellion